Reolian Public Transport Co. (Reolian), was one of the three Bus Public Transport Operators of Macau along with Transmac (Transportes Urbanos de Macau) and TCM (Sociedade de Transportes Colectivos de Macau).

The company was a joint venture between Veolia Transport RATP Asia (VTRA) and a company in Macau, the HN Group. It was declared to file with bankruptcy by the Macau judiciary on December 4, 2013. All bus routes and vehicles previously operated by Reolian were taken over by Macau Nova Era de Autocarros Públicos (known as Macau New Era Public Bus Co in English) with effect on July 1, 2014.

History 
Reolian was founded in 2009 after an invitation to a tender organized by the government of Macau. One of the objectives of the tender was to liberalize the public bus service market by opening this market to more bus operators by grouping the 60 Macau bus lines into five different sections. In this configuration, up to five different bus operators would have the chance to operate.

After the tender result Reolian was selected to operate three of the five sections available, The remaining two sections were granted to Transmac. Transportas Companhia de Macau was initially disqualified for arriving four minutes late in handling its proposal. After several months of legal battles between the government and
Transportas Companhia de Macau, an agreement was reached between all parties on August 13. In exchange for TCM dropping all lawsuits that contest the government's handling of the tendering process, Reolian was deprived from one of its awarded section.

Previous to the operation, Reolian declared that it was facing some difficulties in recruiting the 400 drivers that were necessary to operate properly the 26 bus lines awarded On August 1, 2011, Reolian started its public transport service officially with 250 drivers instead of the planned 400. The Transport Department therefore asked the other two selected operators, Transmac and Transportas Companhia de Macau to support Reolian with some additional services on four lines until additional drivers could be hired.

In September 2011, Reolian increased the wage of its drivers by 30% to accelerate its recruitment process. 60 additional drivers, coming from other two public operators and private shuttle industries, were recruited following this decision. This put an end to the support provided by the other two operators. At the end of the month, Reolian had 390 drivers, 40% of whom were recruited from outside the public transport industry.

The driver turnover rate during the first 3 months of operation was 20%, which was still affecting its stability.

Unfortunately the service of Reolian was considered as unsatisfactory, the Yutong minibus (ZK6770HG) cannot meet the operational requirement in the Macau street and it is always seen broken down on the road. Moreover, the largest bus model in the fleet (ZK6118HGE) with its 10.5m in length cannot satisfy the demand on routes 3 and 10 and it was known to be the worst bus operator in Macau.

Since route H1 can only serve on the Yutong minibus (ZK6770HG), Reolian tried to improve the service by removing a rear seat from the back, installing handrails on the doors and widening the step

In February 2012, Reolian took part in Google Transit program. This public transport route planner for Macau was launched. The data of Macau's 58 regular bus lines (excluding special lines) has been integrated to Google Maps.

In January 2013, Reolian's Maintenance Center has been awarded with the Occupational Health and Safety Assessment Series - OHSAS 18001 Certificate. Reolian is the first public transport company in Macau to receive the certification.

On October 1, 2013, Reolian declared to file for bankruptcy and was taken over by  D.S.A.T until the end of April, 2014.

On July 1, 2014, a bus operator named Macau Nova Era de Autocarros Públicos, SA (with T.C.M. as its majority owner) was created in July 2014. New Era took over all assets and routes previously operated by Reolian. Until August 1, 2018 when New Era and T.C.M. merged companies and formed to become the biggest bus operator in Macau.

Fleet 
Reolian has a fleet of 245 newly equipped buses. 30% of Reolian bus are low entry.

All the buses are equipped with Air Con, LED screen for passenger information, 2 leaf doors (Entrance and Exit Doors), Automatic Gears, and GPS system.

Routes 
Reolian operated 27 of the 62 public bus lines in Macau:

Type of service

Key

Bus routes operated by Reolian

See also 
 Transmac
 Transportas Companhia de Macau
 Transport in Macau

References

External links 
 

Public transport in Macau
RATP Group
Transport companies established in 2009
2009 establishments in Macau
2013 disestablishments in Macau